Kanko, Kankō, Kankou or Kankoh may refer to:

 Kankō (寛弘; 1004-1012) an era in Japanese history
 Kanko Stadium, Okayama, Japan
 Kanko, Korea, Empire of Japan; the Japanese occupation name for the North Korean city of Hamhung
 Kuda-gitsune (管狐, クダ狐), also called "kanko" (kanko-), a type of fox spirit in Japan used for spirit possession
 Kankoh-maru (観光-丸), a proposed reusable rocketship design
 Japanese barque Kankō Maru (観光-丸; 1850-1876), Japan's first steam-powered warship
 Japanese netlayer Kanko Maru (1940) (漢江-丸; 1940-1941), Japanese WWII warship

People
 Assita Kanko (born 1980), Belgian journalist
 Ilkka Antero Kanko (born 1934), Finnish chess champion
 Petr Kanko (born 1984), Czech ice hockey player
 Kankou Coulibaly (born 1990), Malian basketball player
 Kankou Musa, another name for Mansa Musa (1280-1337), emperor of Mali

See also

 Ko-kan
 Kan (disambiguation)
 Ko (disambiguation)
 Kou (disambiguation)
 Koh (disambiguation)